Zlatý slavík was a music poll and an award of the same name established by magazine Mladý svět along with Smena na nedeľu in 1962, and broadcast on television.

While in the first year of the poll 797 votes were returned, the highest vote tally registered in its 29-year history was over 115,000. It later emerged that from the 1970s onwards the entries were frequently falsified by the Communist Party of Czechoslovakia (KSČ). The poll lasted until 1991 and was later replaced by Český slavík.

Winners
Over the years, the categories were occasionally changed.

Leaders
With twenty-two Zlatý slavík awards, Karel Gott is the most successful artist in the history of the poll, followed by Hana Zagorová who scored nine wins, and Naďa Urbánková with five awards.

Successors

See also
 Český slavík
 Slávik Awards

References

 
Czech culture
Slovak culture
Czech music awards